Gorno Lakocerej (Macedonian:  горно лакочереј) is a village near Ohrid, North Macedonia. It has a population of approximately 600 people.

References 

Villages in Ohrid Municipality